DR4 may refer to:
Death receptor 4, human protein
HLA-DR4, human serotype
Direct repeat 4, DNA sequence in the thyroid hormone response element recognized by the thyroid hormone receptor
DR4, a badge-engineered variant of the Refine S3 car